Startime is an anthology show of drama, comedy, and variety, and was one of the first American television shows broadcast in color. The program was aired Tuesday nights in the United States on the NBC network in the 1959–60 season.

Summary
The show was known as either Ford Startime—TV's Finest Hour or Lincoln–Mercury Startime, depending on which division of the Ford Motor Company was presenting commercials within that show. The contents varied from week to week — dramas, musical comedies, and variety shows were all presented.

The show was always broadcast on Tuesday nights. Initially, from the premiere through the end of 1959, the show was broadcast 9:30–10:30 PM (EST) - but, starting on January 5, 1960, the show was broadcast 8:30–9:30 PM (EST). Furthermore, some of the shows first broadcast in 1959 were ninety minutes long, continuing to 11 PM.

Some of the presentations of this series might be considered tryouts—for example, Dean Martin hosted two variety episodes within this series, several years before he began his own successful variety show. The same is true for Mitch Miller, and, to a lesser extent, Art Linkletter.

Production
The Music Corporation of America (MCA), under Lew Wasserman, was the "packager" of the series, providing stars who would not ordinarily appear on American television, such as Alec Guinness and Rex Harrison at reduced rates, in exchange for an overall packaging fee for the entire series paid to MCA. Wasserman was also the agent for Alfred Hitchcock, who directed one Startime episode, "Incident at a Corner" (aired April 5, 1960).

For example, Ingrid Bergman, who at that time commanded a salary of $750,000 per film, and who had never appeared in a dramatic role on American television, was paid $100,000 for her role in Startime's presentation of The Turn of the Screw. Though MCA only received $10,000 (10% of Bergman's salary) as commission, the company also received, as packager, 10% of the entire production schedule of the entire Startime season (which was $7.24 million). In other words, MCA received $724,000 solely for providing to Startime the services of stars such as Bergman, in addition to the commissions for each individual star.

Episodes
{{Episode table |background=#DAA520 |overall=6 |title=30 |airdate=18 |aux1=20 |aux1T=Running time |episodes=

{{Episode list | LineColor = DAA520
 |EpisodeNumber=3
 |Title=The Turn of the Screw |Aux1=90 minutes
 |OriginalAirDate=
 |ShortSummary=Ingrid Bergman starred as the governess in this drama directed by John Frankenheimer, and adapted by James Costigan from the Henry James novel.
}}

}}

Nominations and awards
Alec Guinness, playing the lead role in The Wicked Scheme of Jebal Deeks, received a nomination in the Outstanding Single Performance by an Actor category in the 12th Primetime Emmy Awards. He lost to Laurence Olivier in The Moon and Sixpence.

Canadian version
From October 6, 1959 through June 28, 1960, Ford of Canada broadcast, in the Tuesday 9–11 PM timeslot, on the CBC network in Canada, a show also called Ford Startime, presenting many of the same shows as the American version, alternating with Canadian-produced shows, including adaptions of Arthur Miller's The Crucible (starring Leslie Nielsen), Henrik Ibsen's An Enemy of the People, Oscar Wilde's The Importance of Being Earnest, and James Thurber's The Thirteen Clocks''.

See also
 Ford Theatre
 Ford Festival
 The Ford Show
 Ford Star Jubilee

References

External links
 
 Ford Startime at Classic TV Archive

1959 American television series debuts
1960 American television series endings
1950s American anthology television series
1960s American anthology television series
Ford Motor Company
NBC original programming